The 1965–66 Tercera División season was the 30th since its establishment.

League table

Group 1

Group 2

Group 3

Group 4

Group 5

Group 6 / 7

Group 8

Group 9

Group 10

Group 11

Group 12

Group 13

Group 14

Group 15

Play-offs

Promotion/relegation Segunda División

First round

Tiebreaker:

Marbella received a bye.

Cartagena was qualified by beating 11 to 10 the number of corners, in the tiebreaker match.

Second round

 

Tiebreaker:

Final Round

 

Tiebreaker:

Play-offs (champions)

First round

Logroñés received a bye.

Second round

Tiebreaker:

External links
RSSSF 
Futbolme 

Tercera División seasons
3
Spain